The governor of Washington is the head of government of Washington and commander-in-chief of the state's military forces. The officeholder has a duty to enforce state laws, the power to either approve or veto bills passed by the Washington Legislature and line-item veto power to cancel specific provisions in spending bills. The Washington governor may also convene the legislature on "extraordinary occasions".

Washington Territory had 14 territorial governors from its organization in 1853 until the formation of the state of Washington in 1889. Territorial governors were appointed by the president of the United States. Elisha P. Ferry had the longest term of eight years and went on to become the state's first governor. William H. Wallace was appointed governor but never took office due to being elected as the territory's congressional delegate. George Edward Cole was appointed governor and took office, but his appointment was never ratified by the U.S. Senate and he was replaced as governor after four months.

Twenty-two individuals have held the office of Governor of Washington since the state's admission to the Union, with Arthur B. Langlie serving non-consecutive terms.  Populist Party candidate John Rankin Rogers is the only non-Democratic or Republican nominee to win office. The most recent governor to be from Eastern Washington was Clarence Martin, elected in 1932. The current governor is Democrat Jay Inslee, who took office on January 16, 2013, and was reelected in 2016 and 2020; his term will expire on January 15, 2025. Washington has had the longest current streak of Democratic governors in the nation, with the last Republican to hold the office being John Spellman in 1985.

With the re-election of Inslee in 2020, Langlie, Daniel J. Evans and Inslee are the only three Washington governors to be elected to three terms.

Governors

Governors of the Territory of Washington

Washington Territory was created on March 2, 1853, from the northern half of Oregon Territory. At this point, Washington Territory also included the northern panhandle of modern Idaho and parts of Montana. The southern half of Idaho was assigned to the Washington Territory in 1859 after Oregon was admitted as a state. Idaho Territory was split from Washington Territory in 1863 giving Washington Territory its final borders.

Due to the long distance between Washington, D.C., and Olympia, there was often a lengthy gap between a governor being appointed and his arrival in the territory.

Governors of the State of Washington
Washington was admitted to the Union on November 11, 1889. The term for governor is four years, commencing on the second Monday in the January following the election. If the office of governor is vacant or the governor is unable to discharge their duties, the lieutenant governor assumes the duties of governor, though still officially retains the office of lieutenant governor. If both the offices of governor and lieutenant governor are unable to fulfill their duties, the secretary of state is next in line, and then the treasurer. There is no limit to the number of terms a governor may serve. The office of lieutenant governor is not elected on the same ticket as the governor.

 Parties

Succession

See also
 List of Washington state legislatures

Notes

References
General

 

Constitution

Specific

External links

Office of the Governor of Washington

Lists of state governors of the United States

Governors
Governors of Washington Territory
1889 establishments in Washington (state)